Shin Dong-in (born 21 June 1994) is a South Korean male  track cyclist. He won the gold medal in the madison and the bronze medal in the team pursuit at the 2016 Asian Cycling Championships.

References

External links
 
 
 
 

1994 births
Living people
South Korean track cyclists
South Korean male cyclists
Place of birth missing (living people)
Cyclists at the 2018 Asian Games
Asian Games competitors for South Korea
20th-century South Korean people
21st-century South Korean people